Ernesto Drangosch (22 January 1882, in Buenos Aires – 26 June 1925) was an Argentine pianist and composer. He was a student of Alberto Williams.

He was born Ernst Otto Paul Richard Drangosch in Buenos Aires to German immigrant parents. His parents were Friederich Carl Drangosch and Augusta Emilia Inés Schneider, from Berlin. He was the professor of Carlo Vidussi, who later on was Maurizio Pollini's teacher.

Works, editions, recordings
 Criolla overture 1920
 Sechs lieder op.4
Fier lieder op.9
Drei Lieder - Trois mélodies op.19

References

External links
 

1882 births
1925 deaths
Argentine classical composers
Argentine people of German descent
Male classical composers
20th-century classical composers
Musicians from Buenos Aires
Argentine classical pianists
20th-century classical pianists
19th-century classical pianists
Male classical pianists
20th-century male musicians
19th-century male musicians
Burials at La Chacarita Cemetery